Charles Mauron (1899–1966) was a French translator of contemporary English authors, including E. M. Forster and Virginia Woolf, and a literary critic who made use of psychoanalytic literary criticism. He is noted for his books Aesthetics and Psychology (1935) and Des métaphores obsédantes au mythe personnel (1962). He was married from 1919 to 1949 to the writer Marie Mauron (1896-1986), and their home in Saint-Rémy-de-Provence became a focal-point in the inter-war years for their friends in the Bloomsbury Group.

Psychocriticism
In 1963, Charles Mauron conceived a structured method to interpret literary works via psychoanalysis. The study implied four different phases:
 The creative process is akin to dreaming awake: as such, it is a mimetic, and cathartic, representation of an unconscious impulse or desire that is best expressed and revealed by metaphors and symbols.
 Then, the juxtaposition of a writer's works leads the critic to define symbolical themes.
 These metaphorical networks are significant of a latent inner reality.
 They point at an obsession just as dreams can do. The last phase consists in linking the writer's literary creation to his own personal life.

The author cannot be reduced to a ratiocinating self: his own more or less traumatic biographical past, the cultural archetypes that have suffused his "soul" ironically contrast with the conscious self, The chiasmic relation between the two tales may be seen as a sane and safe acting out. A basically unconscious sexual impulse is symbolically fulfilled in a positive and socially gratifying way, a process known as Sublimation.

Notes

References
 Oxford Companion to French Literature: "Charles Mauron"

1899 births
1966 deaths
French literary critics
French male non-fiction writers
20th-century French male writers